Rainbow Brite is a three-part animated miniseries that was launched on November 6, 2014, by Video On Demand site Feeln. The reboot showcased updated character designs for the cast, and starred Emily Osment as the voice of Rainbow Brite and Molly Ringwald as the voice of Dark Princess. The second episode was shown on November 13 and the series concluded on November 20, 2014.

Cast
 Emily Osment as Rainbow Brite
 Molly Ringwald as Dark Princess
 Marcus Toji as Brian
 Mark C. Hanson as Starlite
 Alexandra Krosney as Stormy / Canary Yellow
 Cam Clarke as Murky Dismal / Red Butler
 Todd Bosley as Lurky
 Mariana Flores as Mr. Glitters / Captain Fuzz / Patty O'Green
 Evan Cooper as Buddy Blue

References

External links
 

2014 American television series debuts
2014 American television series endings
2010s American animated television miniseries
American children's animated adventure television series
American children's animated fantasy television series
Animated television series about orphans
Animated television series reboots
English-language television shows
Hallmark Cards